Nottingham Forest Under-23s are the reserve team of Nottingham Forest. The team mainly consists of Under-23 players at the club, although senior players occasionally play in the reserve side, for instance when they are recovering from injury.

Nottingham Forest F.C. Under 18s are the youth team of Nottingham Forest. The youth team is coached by Gareth Holmes. The Nottingham Forest Academy as a whole is managed by Gary Brazil.

Under 23s & Under 18s

The Nottingham Forest F.C. Youth Academy was launched in 1997 under the supervision of Paul Hart. The academy is run by full and part-time staff including ex-professional footballers alongside Gary Brazil. The academy is located at a  site in Nottingham. Since its inception the academy has nurtured the talents of many players that have made it into top flight football; these include Jermaine Jenas, Michael Dawson, his brother Andy, James Perch, Carlos Merino, Scott Loach, Andy Reid and Marlon Harewood. Many of these players have gone on to play at international level. Others were released by the academy and went on to develop their careers successfully elsewhere, including Shaun Wright-Phillips and Tom Huddlestone.

The Nottingham Forest youth team has been part of the Premier Academy League since 1997, playing in group D. Their best season was 2000–01 when they won the whole competition. They almost repeated this in the 2009–10 season but eventually lost 5–3 to Arsenal in the play-off final.

The Nottingham Forest academy was officially renamed The Nigel Doughty Academy in October 2012 in memory of the former owner Nigel Doughty, who died earlier in the year.

Reserves and Academy

Reserves and Academy out on loan

Under 18s squad

Staff

Honours

Premier Academy League
Winners: 2000-2001
Dallas Cup
Winners: 2002

Notable Academy graduates and attendees
Players currently playing for Nottingham Forest are listed below in bold. The decade players are listed in indicates when they began playing with the academy, not the first team.

1960s

 Bob Chapman
 Duncan McKenzie
 Henry Newton
 Ian Storey-Moore

1970s

 Viv Anderson
 Paul Bannon
 Stuart Gray
 Bryn Gunn
 Gary Mills
 John Robertson
 Steve Sutton
 Tony Woodcock
 Chris Woods

1980s

 David Campbell
 Gary Charles
 Steve Chettle
 Paul Crichton
 Nigel Clough
 Mark Crossley
 Sean Dyche
 Chris Fairclough
 Scot Gemmill
 Lee Glover
 Steve Hodge
 Bobby Howe
 Ian Kilford
 Steve Stone
 Des Walker

1990s

 Craig Armstrong
 Julian Bennett
 Brian Cash
 Richard Cooper
 Andy Dawson
 Kevin Dawson
 Michael Dawson
 Gareth Edds
 Keith Foy
 Simon Francis
 Robbie Gibbons
 Phil Gilchrist
 Mark Goodlad
 Steve Guinan
 Marlon Harewood
 Tom Huddlestone
 Jermaine Jenas
 Ian Kilford
 Richard Liburd
 Paul McGregor
 Steve Melton
 Carlos Merino
 Chris O'Grady
 James Perch
 Jon-Paul Pittman
 David Prutton
 Andy Reid
 Andy Todd
 Justin Walker
 Vance Warner
 Craig Westcarr
 Gareth Williams
 Shaun Wright-Phillips

2000s

 Mickaël Antoine-Curier
 Patrick Bamford
 Felix Bastians
 Hamza Bencherif
 Jack Blake
 Matt Bodkin
 Eugen Bopp
 Oliver Burke
 Mark Byrne
 Neill Byrne
 Callum Chettle
 Karl Darlow
 Tony Diagne
 Vincent Fernandez
 Kieron Freeman
 Usman Gondal
 Kieran Hayes
 Joe Heath
 Arif Karaoğlan
 Jamaal Lascelles
 Lewis McGugan
 Alex Mighten
 Brendan Moloney
 David Morgan
 Wes Morgan
 Ben Osborn
 Alan Power
 Shane Redmond
 Gregor Robertson
 Barry Roche
 Nialle Rodney
 Tom Shaw
 Emile Sinclair
 Jordan Smith
 Richard Tait
 Robert Taylor
 John Thompson
 George Thomson
 Matt Thornhill
 Kieran Wallace
 Spencer Weir-Daley
 Ryan Yates

2010s

 Anel Ahmedhodžić
 Arvin Appiah
 Kostakis Artymatas
 Fin Back
 Matthew Bondswell
 Liam Bossin
 Ben Brereton Díaz
 Matty Cash
 Adam Crookes
 Aaron Donnelly
 Toby Edser
 Danny Elliott
 Yassine En-Neyah
 Tim Erlandsson
 Dimitar Evtimov
 Morgan Ferrier
 Tyrese Fornah
 Jordan Gabriel
 Adrian Galliani
 Virgil Gomis
 Jorge Grant
 Oliver Hammond
 Riley Harbottle
 Alex Iacovitti
 Brennan Johnson
 Idris Kadded
 Andreas Karo
 Konstantinos Laifis
 Josh Macdonald
 Kyle McClean
 Gerry McDonagh
 Jake Mulraney
 Frederik Nielsen
 Konstantinos Panagou
 Deimantas Petravičius
 Ilias Polimos
 Danny Preston
 Max Ram
 Rezart Rama
 Josh Rees
 Jayden Richardson
 Roger Riera
 Marcelo Saraiva
 Marios Siampanis
 Will Swan
 Jake Taylor
 Nikolay Todorov
 Tyler Walker
 Joe Worrall
 Jordan Wright

2020s

 Brandon Aguilera
 Baba Fernandes
 Billy Fewster
 Ateef Konaté

References

Reserves and Academy
Football academies in England
Central Combination